Lanphier is a surname and may refer to:

 Fay Lanphier (1905–1959), model
 James Lanphier (1920–1969), American actor
 Jeremiah Lanphier (1809–1898), lay missionary
 Thomas George Lanphier Sr. (1890–1972), early aviator
 Thomas George Lanphier Jr. (1915–1987), World War II pilot

See also
 Lanphier High School, Springfield, Illinois